Democratic Evolution Movement of Central Africa (MEDAC) was a political party in the Central African Republic led by Abel Goumba.

History
MEDAC was founded in 1960 by Goumba and Pierre Maléombho, the former president of the National Assembly who was ousted by Dacko, after they left the Movement for the Social Evolution of Black Africa.

In late 1960 MEDAC mobilized protests against the increasingly authoritarian rule of David Dacko. Goumba became more and more critical of the French backing of Dacko. At a parliamentary session, MEDAC MPs staged a walk-out following accusations by Dacko that MEDAC was supporting tribalism. On 23 December MEDAC was dissolved by the government. Goumba's parliamentary immunity was repealed, and together with seven other MEDAC leaders he was arrested.

References

1960 disestablishments in the Central African Republic
1960 establishments in the Central African Republic
Defunct political parties in the Central African Republic
Political parties disestablished in 1960
Political parties established in 1960